Tom Sexton (born 1940) is an Alaskan poet and scholar who became the state's Poet Laureate in 1995

Childhood and education
Sexton grew up in Lowell, Massachusetts. After graduating from Lowell High School in 1958, he spent three years in the Army – two of them stationed in Alaska. He then worked odd jobs, before enrolling in Northern Essex Community College in Haverhill, Massachusetts, where he helped found the college's literary magazine Parnassus, a multi-award winning publication still in print today. 

He went on to enter Salem State College, graduating in 1968 with a bachelor's degree in English. He then went to the University of Alaska, where he earned a Master of Fine Arts degree and was hired to help establish the English Department at the newly opened Anchorage Campus.

Career
From 1970 to 1994, Sexton taught English and creative writing at the University of Alaska – Anchorage where he established the creative writing program and served as English Department chair for several years. He was a founding editor of the Alaska Quarterly Review, leaving the magazine when he retired in 1994. He was appointed Alaska's Poet Laureate in 1995, having been selected by the Alaska State Council on the Arts (AKSCA) and confirmed by the Alaskan legislature.

Sexton is the author of ten books of poetry. His A Clock With No Hands is a collection of poems about growing up in Lowell.  His most recent book is For the Sake of the Light, which includes "Alaska Spring," a poem that was set to music by American composer Libby Larsen and premiered April 21, 2012 for the 25th anniversary of the Alaska Chamber Singers.

Personal life
Sexton and his wife, Sharyn, spend every other winter in Eastport, Maine.

Notes

American male poets
Living people
1940 births
Writers from Lowell, Massachusetts
Writers from Anchorage, Alaska
University of Alaska Fairbanks alumni
Salem State University alumni
University of Alaska Anchorage people
Poets Laureate of Alaska
People from Eastport, Maine
Poets from Alaska
20th-century American poets
20th-century American male writers